Lagochilus inebrians, commonly known as inebriating mint, intoxicating mint, or Turkistan mint, is a member of the mint family, Lamiaceae. The name Lagochilus inebrians is derived from the Greek words lagos and cheilos, literally meaning "hare" and "lip/cheek" and inebrians meaning intoxicating, thus translating to intoxicating hare's lip. The name reflects the morphology of the upper lip of the flower's corolla.

Lagochilus inebrians is widely distributed in the Samarkand and Bukhara provinces of Uzbekistan. It is also found in some areas of Turkmenistan and Tajikistan. It grows on the piedmont plains and low foothills, dried up streams and rubbly slopes, on scree and gravel, and in dry grassy-sagebrush and grassland steppes.

Taxonomy
Lagochilus inebrians is a member of the family Lamiaceae and the genus Lagochilus. Leaves are opposite, broad, both sides are covered with scattered hairs and glands. Leaves broadly ovate, pubescent on both sides. Flowers sit in the axils of upper leaves. Corolla is white or pale pink with brown veins. Calyx is pubescent, wide-belled and five-petaled. The fruits are naked brown nuts. The flowers bloom May through June and it ripens in August through September.

Uses
In the folk medicine of Central Asia, L. inebrians is used as a styptic.  The dried form of L. inebrians collected during its flowering period is used as a medicinal product and as a raw material. The raw material consists of a mixture of flowers and a small number of small leaves and thin stalks of green or dark-brownish color. The raw material contains the diterpene lagochiline, essential oils, tannins, organic acids, carotene, ascorbic acid, calcium, iron, and other compounds.

When harvesting L. inebrians - 1-2 fruiting plants are left untouched for every  to ensure their renewal. For normal regrowth and replenishment of this species harvesting its raw materials on the same sites is allowed no more than once in 2–3 years. Drying the raw material is done in the shade for 5–6 days, stirring occasionally. Flowers and leaves are separated from stems by shaking it down. Harvested raw materials are stored in dry, ventilated areas.

References

Sagewisdom.org:  Lagochilus  
Erowid.org: Golden Guide — online book. 
Erowid.org: Golden Guide pdf  

Lamiaceae
Flora of Tajikistan
Flora of Turkmenistan
Flora of Uzbekistan
Medicinal plants of Asia
Plants described in 1847
Taxa named by Alexander von Bunge